Punctum, plural puncta, adjective punctate, is an anatomical term for a sharp point or tip. It may also refer to:

Medical 
Lacrimal punctum, a minute opening on the margins of the eyelids that collect tears produced by the lacrimal glands
Blind spot (vision), or punctum cecum, the blind spot in human vision corresponding to the location of the optic disk
Erb's point (neurology) or punctum nervosum, a nerve point in the human neck
Imperforate lacrimal punctum, a congenital disorder of dogs

Unrelated species named punctum 
Allium punctum, a species of wild onion
Amyna punctum, a moth of the family Noctuidae
Cinguloterebra punctum, a sea snail of the family Terebridae
Phylloxiphia punctum, a moth of the family Sphingidae
Sepsis punctum, a fly of the family Sepsidae
Zygaena punctum, a moth of the family Zygaenidae

Other 
Punctum (gastropod), a genus of land snails
Punctum delens, typographic marks used to indicate deletion
Neume, the basic element of Western and Eastern systems of musical notation prior to the invention of five-line staff notation
Equant, punctum aequans, is a mathematical concept developed by Claudius Ptolemy in the 2nd century AD to account for the observed motion of heavenly bodies
A concept in the 1980 French philosophy book Camera Lucida
a medieval unit of time corresponding to a Quarter-hour
In photography, a term used by Roland Barthes to refer to an incidental but personally poignant detail in a photograph
 Punctate, a botanical term meaning marked with an indefinite number of dots, spots, pits or glands